The Lord of the Rings: The Two Towers is a 2002 epic fantasy adventure film directed by Peter Jackson from a screenplay by Fran Walsh, Philippa Boyens, Stephen Sinclair, and Jackson, based on 1954's The Two Towers, the second volume of the novel The Lord of the Rings by J. R. R. Tolkien. The sequel to 2001's The Lord of the Rings: The Fellowship of the Ring, the film is the second instalment in The Lord of the Rings trilogy. It features an ensemble cast including Elijah Wood, Ian McKellen, Liv Tyler, Viggo Mortensen, Sean Astin, Cate Blanchett, John Rhys-Davies, Bernard Hill, Christopher Lee, Billy Boyd, Dominic Monaghan, Orlando Bloom, Hugo Weaving, Miranda Otto, David Wenham, Brad Dourif, Karl Urban, and Andy Serkis.

Continuing the plot of the previous film, it intercuts three storylines. Frodo and Sam continue their journey towards Mordor to destroy the One Ring, meeting and joined by Gollum, the ring's former keeper. Aragorn, Legolas, and Gimli come to the war-torn nation of Rohan and are reunited with the resurrected Gandalf, before fighting against the legions of the treacherous wizard Saruman at the Battle of Helm's Deep. Merry and Pippin escape capture, meet Treebeard the Ent, and help to plan an attack on Isengard, fortress of Saruman.

The Two Towers was financed and distributed by American studio New Line Cinema, but filmed and edited entirely in Jackson's native New Zealand, concurrently with the other two parts of the trilogy. It premiered on 5 December 2002 at the Ziegfeld Theatre in New York City, and was then released on 18 December in the United States and on 19 December in New Zealand. The film was acclaimed by both critics and audiences, who considered it to be a landmark in filmmaking and an achievement in the fantasy film genre. It received praise for its direction, action sequences, performances, musical score, and CGI, particularly for Gollum. It grossed over $936 million worldwide, making it the highest-grossing film of 2002 and the third highest-grossing film of all time at the time of its release, behind Titanic and Harry Potter and the Philosopher's Stone. Following subsequent reissues, it has, as of 2021, grossed over $947 million.

Like the other films in the trilogy, The Two Towers is widely recognized as one of the greatest and most influential films ever made. The film received numerous accolades; at the 75th Academy Awards, it was nominated for six awards, including Best Picture, winning for Best Sound Editing and Best Visual Effects.

The final instalment of the trilogy, The Return of the King, was released in 2003.

Plot

Awakening from a dream of Gandalf fighting the Balrog in Moria, Frodo Baggins finds himself, along with Samwise Gamgee, lost in the Emyn Muil near Mordor. They discover that they are being tracked by Gollum, a former bearer of the One Ring. Capturing Gollum, Frodo takes pity and allows him to guide them, reminding Sam that they will need Gollum's help to infiltrate Mordor.

Aragorn, Legolas, and Gimli pursue a band of Uruk-hai to save their companions Merry and Pippin, entering the kingdom of Rohan. The Uruk-hai are ambushed by a group of Rohirrim, allowing Merry and Pippin to escape into Fangorn Forest. Meeting Aragorn's group, the Rohirrim's leader Éomer explains that he and his men have been exiled by Rohan's king, Théoden, who is under the control of Saruman and his servant Gríma Wormtongue. Éomer believes Merry and Pippin were killed during the raid but leaves the group two horses. In Fangorn, Aragorn's group encounters Gandalf, who after his fight against the Balrog was resurrected as Gandalf the White to help save Middle-earth.

Gandalf leads the trio to Rohan's capital, Edoras, where Gandalf frees Théoden from Saruman's control. Aragorn stops Théoden from executing Wormtongue, who flees. Learning of Saruman's plans to destroy Rohan with his Uruk-hai army, Théoden evacuates his citizens to the fortress of The Hornburg at Helm's Deep. Gandalf departs to find Éomer and his followers, hoping they will fight for their restored king. Aragorn befriends Théoden's niece, Éowyn, who becomes infatuated with him. When the refugees travelling to Helm's Deep are attacked by Saruman's Warg-riding Orcs, Aragorn falls from a cliff and is presumed dead. He is found by Théodred's horse Brego and rides to Helm's Deep, witnessing Saruman's army marching to the fortress.

In Rivendell, Arwen is told by her father Elrond that Aragorn will not return. He reminds her that if she remains in Middle-earth, she will outlive Aragorn by thousands of years, and she reluctantly departs for Valinor. Elrond is contacted by Galadriel of Lothlórien, who convinces him that the Elves should honour their alliance to men, and they dispatch an army of Elves to Helm's Deep.

In Fangorn, Merry and Pippin meet Treebeard, an Ent. Convincing Treebeard that they are allies, they are brought to an Ent Council, where the Ents decide not to take part in the coming war. Pippin asks Treebeard to take them in the direction of Isengard, where they witness the deforestation caused by Saruman's war effort. Enraged, Treebeard and the Ents storm Isengard, trapping Saruman in his tower.

Aragorn arrives at Helm's Deep, bringing word that Saruman's army is close and Théoden must prepare for battle despite being vastly outnumbered. The army of Elves from Lothlórien arrives, as does Saruman's army, and a battle ensues. The Uruk-hai breach the outer wall with explosives and during the ensuing charge kill the Elves' commander, Haldir. The defenders retreat into the keep, where Aragorn convinces Théoden to meet the Uruk-hai in one last charge. At dawn, as the defenders are overwhelmed, Gandalf and Éomer arrive with the Rohirrim, turning the tide of the battle. The surviving Uruk-hai flee into Fangorn Forest and are killed by the trees. Gandalf warns that Sauron will retaliate.

Gollum leads Frodo and Sam through the Dead Marshes to the Black Gate, but recommends they enter Mordor by another route. Frodo and Sam are captured by Rangers of Ithilien led by Faramir, younger brother of the late Boromir. Frodo helps Faramir catch Gollum to save him from being killed by the Rangers. Learning of the One Ring, Faramir takes his captives to Gondor to bring the ring to his father Denethor. Passing through the besieged city of Osgiliath, Frodo tries to explain to Faramir the true nature of the ring, and Sam explains that Boromir was driven mad by its power. A Nazgûl nearly captures Frodo, who falls under the ring's power, but Sam saves him and reminds him that they are fighting for the good still left in Middle-earth. Impressed by Frodo's resolve, Faramir releases them. Feeling betrayed, Gollum decides he will reclaim the Ring by leading Frodo to "Her" upon arriving at Cirith Ungol.

Cast

Like the other films in the series, The Two Towers has an ensemble cast, and the cast and their respective characters include:
 Elijah Wood as Frodo Baggins: A young hobbit sent on a quest to destroy the One Ring, the burden of which is becoming heavier.
 Ian McKellen as Gandalf the White: An Istari wizard who fell fighting a Balrog and has now returned, more powerful than ever, to finish his task.
 Viggo Mortensen as Aragorn: The heir-in-exile to Gondor's throne who has come to Rohan's defence.
 Sean Astin as Samwise Gamgee: Better known as Sam, Frodo's loyal hobbit gardener and companion.
 Andy Serkis as Gollum : A wretched hobbit-like creature originally known as Sméagol Trahald, who owned the Ring for 500 years and now guides Frodo on his quest.
 Billy Boyd as Peregrin Took: An extremely foolish hobbit who is a distant cousin of Frodo and travels with the Fellowship on their journey to Mordor.
 Dominic Monaghan as Meriadoc Brandybuck: Better known as Merry, a distant cousin of Frodo's who is mistakenly captured along with Pippin by the Uruk-hai.
 John Rhys-Davies as Gimli: A dwarf warrior and one of Aragorn's companions.
 Also voices Treebeard: The leader of the ents, who is roused to anger after seeing that Saruman had decimated a large part of Fangorn Forest.
 Orlando Bloom as Legolas: An elven archer and one of Aragorn's companions.
 Bernard Hill as Théoden: The King of Rohan, who is under Saruman's spell until Gandalf heals him so he can lead his people once more. Kevin Conway was offered the role but he declined.
 Christopher Lee as Saruman the White: An Istari wizard waging war upon Rohan and devastating Fangorn Forest, who allied himself with Sauron in the previous film.
 Hugo Weaving as Elrond: The Elven-Lord of Rivendell who expresses doubt over his daughter's love for Aragorn.
 Miranda Otto as Éowyn: Théoden's niece, who is in love with Aragorn. Uma Thurman was offered the role but turned it down and later regretted it.
 David Wenham as Faramir: A prince of the Stewards of Gondor and captain of the Ithilien Rangers, who captures Frodo, Sam and Gollum.
 Brad Dourif as Gríma Wormtongue: An agent of Saruman at Edoras, who renders Théoden incapable of decisions, and desires Éowyn. 
 Karl Urban as Éomer: Théoden's nephew and previous Chief Marshal of the Riddermark who was exiled by Gríma.
 Liv Tyler as Arwen: An elven princess of Rivendell and Aragorn's true love.
 Cate Blanchett as Galadriel: The Elven-Queen of Lothlórien, who discusses Middle-earth's future with Elrond.
 Sean Bean as Boromir: Faramir's older brother and a fallen member of the Fellowship who appears in flashbacks since his death, more prominently in the film's extended edition.
 Craig Parker as Haldir: The leader of the Lórien Elves sent by Elrond and Galadriel to defend Helm's Deep.
 John Leigh as Háma: The loyal doorwarden of the Golden Hall and a majordomo of Théoden.
 Bruce Hopkins as Gamling: Théoden's chief lieutenant and a skilled member of the Royal Guard of Rohan.
 John Bach as Madril: Faramir's closest aide, who informs him of battle preparations.
 Nathaniel Lees as Ugluk: The leader of the band of Uruk-hai who kidnapped Merry and Pippin.

The following appear only in the Extended Edition
 John Noble as Denethor: The corrupt Steward of Gondor and the father of Boromir and Faramir. 

In the Battle of Helm's Deep, Peter Jackson has a cameo appearance as one of the men on top of the gate, throwing a spear at the attacking Uruk-hai. His children and Elijah Wood's sister cameo as young refugees in the caves behind the Hornburg, and Alan Lee and Dan Hennah also cameo as soldiers preparing for the battle. The son of a producer's friend, Hamish Duncan, appears as a reluctant young Rohirrim warrior. Daniel Falconer has a cameo as an Elvish archer at the battle.

Comparison to the source material

Screenwriters did not originally script The Two Towers as its own film; The Lord of the Rings trilogy was initially written as a two-part series to be produced by Miramax, with parts of The Two Towers written as the conclusion to The Fellowship of the Ring. The two films became a trilogy under New Line, and writers Jackson, Walsh and Boyens shuffled their scripts. 

The most distinct difference from the book by J.R.R. Tolkien is its structure. Tolkien's The Two Towers is split into two parts, opening with the war in Rohan, and concluding with focus on the journey of Frodo and Sam. The film omits the book's opening, Boromir's death, which was used as a linear climax at the end of The Fellowship of the Ring. Where the book ends with the Fellowship going to Isengard and Frodo's confrontation with Shelob, the film climaxes with the Battle of Helm's Deep, leaving the aforementioned scenes for the film adaptation of The Return of the King. This was done partly to fit more closely the timeline indicated by the book.

In the film, Théoden is possessed by Saruman, whereas in the book he is depicted as depressed and deluded by Wormtongue. Afterwards, in the film, Théoden is still unsure of what to do, and flees to Helm's Deep. In the book he rides out to war, only ending up besieged when he considers helping Erkenbrand. Erkenbrand does not exist in the films: his character is combined with Éomer as the Rohirrim general who arrives with Gandalf at the film's end. Éomer himself is present during the entire battle in the book.

On the way to Helm's Deep, the refugees from Edoras are attacked by Wargs, similar to a scene in The Fellowship of the Ring where the Fellowship who battles a group of Wargs. Here, a new subplot is created where Aragorn falls over a cliff, and is assumed to be dead; Jackson stated that he added it to create tension. This scene also resonates with a new subplot regarding Arwen, where she decides to leave Middle-earth after losing hope in the long-term possibilities of her love. In the book, Arwen's role is primarily recorded in the Appendices, and she is never depicted as considering such an act.

A larger change was originally planned: Arwen and Elrond would visit Galadriel, and Arwen would accompany an army of Elves to Helm's Deep to fight alongside Aragorn. During shooting, the script changed, both from writers coming up with better ideas to portray the romance between Aragorn and Arwen, as well as poor fan reaction. The new scene of Arwen leaving for the West was created, and the conversation scene remains, edited to be a flashback to a conversation between them in Rivendell, on the evening before the Fellowship's departure. A conversation between Elrond and Galadriel in Lothlórien was edited to be a telepathic one. Nonetheless, one major change (already filmed) remained that could not be reversed: the Elven warriors fighting at Helm's Deep, although Jackson and Boyens found this romantic and stirring and a reference to how, in the Appendices of The Return of the King, Galadriel and the Elves of Lothlórien, and Thranduil of Mirkwood were first attacked by an army out of Dol Guldur in Mirkwood, and then later counter-attacked and assaulted the fortress itself.

Another change is the fact Treebeard does not immediately decide to go to war. This adds to the tension, and Boyens describes it as making Merry and Pippin "more than luggage". Here, the Hobbits show Treebeard what Saruman has done to the forest, prompting his decision to act. Another structural change is that the Hobbits meet Gandalf the White early on, explaining why the Hobbits do not react to his return when they meet him again following Isengard's destruction. This was explained in the book by Gandalf arriving at Isengard in the middle of the night to talk to Treebeard.

The filmmakers' decision to leave Shelob for the third film meant that Faramir had to become an obstacle for Frodo and Sam. In the book, Faramir (like Aragorn) quickly recognises the Ring as a danger and a temptation, and does not hesitate long before letting Frodo and Sam go. In the film, Faramir first decides that the Ring shall go to Gondor and his father Denethor, as a way to prove his worth. In the film, Faramir takes Frodo, Sam and the Ring to the Battle of Osgiliath—they do not go there in the book. Jackson winks to readers with Sam's line, "By all rights we shouldn't even be here, but we are." After seeing how strongly the Ring affects Frodo during the Nazgûl attack, Faramir changes his mind and lets them go. These changes reshape the book's contrast between Faramir and Boromir, who in The Fellowship of the Ring attempted to take the Ring for himself. On the other hand, (which can be seen only in the film's extended version), it is actually their father who wants the Ring and urges Boromir to get it, while Faramir only wants to prove himself to his father. Boyens contends these plot changes were needed to keep the Ring menacing. Wenham commented on the DVD documentaries that he had not read the book prior to reading the script, so the film's version of Faramir was the Faramir he knew. When he later read the book and noticed the major difference, he approached the writers about it, and they explained to him that if he did say "I wouldn't pick that thing up even if it lay by the wayside", it would basically strip the One Ring of all corruptive power.

The meaning of the title itself, 'The Two Towers', was changed. While Tolkien considered several possible sets of towers he eventually created a final cover illustration and wrote a note included at the end of The Fellowship of the Ring which identified them as Minas Morgul and Orthanc. Jackson's film names them as Orthanc and Barad-dûr, symbolic of an evil alliance out to destroy Men that forms the film's plot point. The film depicted Saruman openly presenting himself outright as Sauron's servant, whereas this association was not explicitly stated in the novel (and indeed analysis by Gandalf and Aragorn in the chapter "The White Rider" stated that there was a rivalry instead, as Saruman was afraid of the prospect of being at war with Sauron, if Rohan and Gondor fell).

Production

Production design
When Alan Lee joined the project in late 1997, Helm's Deep was the first structure he was tasked to design. At 1:35 scale, it was one of the first miniatures built for the film, and was part of the 45-minute video that sold the project to New Line. It was primarily drawn from an illustration Lee had once done for the book, though the curved wall featured in the film was proposed by fellow illustrator and designer John Howe. Used in the film for wide shots, Jackson also used this miniature to plan the battle, using 40,000 toy soldiers.

Helm's Deep, a pivotal part of the film's narrative, was built at Dry Creek Quarry with its gate, a ramp, and a wall, which included a removable section as well as the tower on a second level.

The film explores the armies of Middle-earth. John Howe was the basic designer of the evil forces of Middle Earth, with the Uruk-hai being the first army approved by Jackson. Howe also designed a special crossbow for the Uruk-Hai characters, which was significant because it did not require external tools to rearm. This design was the realization of a 16th-century manuscript. Also created were 100 Elven suits of armour, for which emphasis was placed on Autumnal colours due to the theme of Elves leaving Middle-earth. Two hundred and fifty suits were also made for the Rohirrim. The designs for Rohan were based on Germanic and Anglo-Saxon patterns, with most of the weapons designed by John Howe and forged by Peter Lyon. Each sword took 3 to 6 days to make.

The exterior of the Rohirrim's capital of Edoras, including its thatched roofs, took six months to build on Mount Sunday. The interior of the buildings doubled as offices and lunch halls. The interior of the Hall of Edoras was filmed at Stone Street Studios with tapestries designed by Lee, and Théoden's wooden throne was partly created by his daughter. Hill endured heavy make-up for the possession scene where his skin was pulled back and released for increased wrinkles. Dourif shaved off his eyebrows and put potato flakes as dandruff in his hair for unnerving effect.

Through Frodo and Sam's story, the film also provides a look at Mordor and Gondor. Barad-dûr is fully seen in a tracking shot, a design which Howe called a mockery of Gothic Cathedrals. He and Lee created the Black Gate (though a typo in the script made the miniature into two) and Osgiliath, a ruined city reflecting London during the Blitz or Berlin in 1945. The set on a backlot was based around a bridge and reused some of Moria.

Principal photography

The Two Towers shared principal photography with The Fellowship of the Ring and The Return of the King. The trilogy was filmed between 11 October 1999 and 22 December 2000. The scenes which take place in Rohan were shot earlier in the production, during which time Viggo Mortensen, Orlando Bloom and John Rhys-Davies' stunt double Brett Beattie sustained many injuries. Mortensen broke two toes when he kicked an Orc helmet while filming the scene in which he, Legolas, and Gimli find the remains of the Uruk-hai and believing Merry and Pippin to be dead (a shot which is included in the film). Furthermore, during filming Bloom fell off his horse and cracked three ribs, and Beattie dislocated his knee. These injuries led to the actors suffering two days of pain during the running sequence in the first act of the film, leading Jackson to jokingly refer to them as "The Walking Wounded."

The filming of the Battle of Helm's Deep took approximately three months, with most of the nighttime shots handled by John Mahaffie. Some injuries were sustained during the filming of the sequence, including Mortensen chipping his tooth, and Bernard Hill's ear getting slashed. The sequence also features 500 extras, who insulted each other in Māori, and improvised scenes such as the Uruk-hai stamping their spears before the beginning of the battle. However, there was alleged annoyance among the film's crew for the strength of the gates, which were claimed to be too reinforced during the Battering Ram scene. Mortensen greatly respected the stunt team, and head butted them often as a sign of that respect.

Wood and Astin were joined by Serkis on 13 April 2000.

Special effects
As with The Fellowship of the Ring, Jim Rygiel served as the visual effects supervisor for The Two Towers, while newcomer Joe Letteri joined the visual effects team to supervise Andy Serkis's motion capture performance in the creation of the character Gollum. During the production of The Two Towers Weta Digital doubled their staff members of 260. In total, they would produce 73 minutes of digital effects with 799 shots. The film would feature their first challenge in creating a battle scene, as well as creating two digital characters who needed to act rather than be a set piece, unlike the previous film's Cave Troll and Balrog.

Gollum 

Weta began animating Gollum in late 1998 to convince New Line they could achieve the effect. Andy Serkis "played" Gollum by providing his voice and movements on set, as well as performing within the motion capture suit later on. His scenes were filmed twice, with and without him. Originally, Gollum was set to solely be a CGI character, but Jackson was so impressed by Serkis' audition tape that they used him on set as well.

Gollum's CGI model was also redesigned during 2001 when Serkis was cast as Sméagol, Gollum's former self, so as to give the impression Andy Serkis as Sméagol transforms into the CGI Gollum. The original model can still be glimpsed briefly in the first film. Over Christmas 2001, the crew proceeded to reanimate all the previous shots accordingly within two months. Another problem was that the crew realized that the cast performed better in the takes which physically included Serkis. In the end, the CGI Gollum was rotoscoped and animated on top of these scenes.

Serkis' motion capture was generally used to animate Gollum's body, except for some difficult shots such as him crawling upside down. Gollum's face was animated manually, often using recordings of Serkis as a guide. Gino Acevedo supervised realistic skin tones, which took four hours per frame to render.

While the novel alludes to a division within his mind, the film depicts him as having a split personality. The two personas—the childlike Sméagol and the evil Gollum—are established during a scene in which they argue over remaining loyal to Frodo. The two personalities talk to each other, as established by contrasting camera angles and by Serkis altering his voice and physicality for each persona.

Treebeard 
Treebeard took between 28 and 48 hours per frame to render. For scenes where he interacts with Merry and Pippin, a 14-foot-tall puppet was built on a wheel. Weta took urethane moulds of tree bark and applied them to the sculpt of Treebeard to create his wooden skin. Dominic Monaghan and Billy Boyd sat on bicycle seats concealed into Treebeard's hands to avoid discomfort and were left alone on set sitting in the puppet's hands during breaks. The puppet was shot against bluescreen.

Score

The musical score for The Two Towers was composed, orchestrated, and conducted by Howard Shore, who also composed the music for the other two films in the series. While the scores for its predecessor and sequel won the Academy Award for Best Score, the soundtrack for The Two Towers was not nominated. Initially there was confusion over the score's eligibility due to a new rule applying to sequels, but the academy did declare it eligible.

The score features The London Philharmonic Orchestra, London Voices, The London Oratory School Schola and several vocal and instrumental soloists, including soprano Isabel Bayrakdarian, and Irish fiddler and violinist Dermot Crehan, who also performed on the Hardanger fiddle, which is used in this film in conjunction with the various Rohan themes.

The funeral song Éowyn sings during her cousin Théodred's entombment in the extended edition is styled to be a traditional song of the Rohirrim, and has lyrics in their language, Rohirric (represented by Old English). The song does not appear in the book, and the tune is a variation upon a theme of the rímur Icelandic folk tradition; it can be heard as part of track 7 in the 1999 recording of a musical version of the Edda by Sequentia.

The soundtrack was recorded at Abbey Road Studios. The soundtrack has a picture of Peter Jackson (barefoot), the composer, and two producers crossing Abbey Road, referencing The Beatles' album of the same name.

Release

Marketing
The teaser trailer premiered in theaters on 3 July 2002 with the release of Men in Black II. The theatrical trailer was then released theatrically on 4 October 2002 with the debut of Red Dragon.

Home media

VHS and DVD
The Two Towers was released on VHS and DVD on 26 August 2003 in the United States. The date was originally intended to be a simultaneous worldwide release, but due to a bank holiday weekend in the United Kingdom, some British outlets began selling DVDs as much as four days earlier, much to the ire of the UK distributor, Entertainment in Video, which had threatened to withhold advance supplies of subsequent DVD releases. During its first five days of release, the DVD release sold over 3.5 million units. The film also generated $22.8 million in rentals, breaking The Bourne Identitys record for having the biggest rentals of any DVD release. By December 2003, it was reported that The Two Towers sold 16.4 million copies and earned $305.4 million in sales revenue, becoming the second-highest selling home video release of 2003, after Finding Nemo.

As with Fellowship, an extended edition of Two Towers was released on VHS and DVD on 18 November 2003 with 45 minutes of new material, added special effects and music, plus 11 minutes of fan-club credits. The runtime expanded to 235 minutes. The 4-disc DVD set included four commentaries along with hours of supplementary material.

In August 2006, a limited edition was released on DVD, and included both theatrical and extended editions on a double-sided disc along with all-new bonus material.

Blu-ray
The theatrical Blu-ray version of The Lord of the Rings was released in the United States in April 2010. The individual disc of Two Towers was released in September 2010 with the same special features as the complete trilogy release, minus digital copy.

The extended Blu-ray editions were released in the US and Canada in June 2011.

Two Towers was released in Ultra HD Blu-ray on 30 November 2020 in the United Kingdom and on 1 December 2020 in the United States, along with the other installments, including both theatrical and extended cuts.

Reception

Box office
The Two Towers opened in theaters on 18 December 2002. During its opening day, the film grossed $26 million, making it the second-highest opening Wednesday, behind Star Wars: Episode I – The Phantom Menace. It earned $62,007,528 in its opening weekend in the US and Canada, becoming the fifth-highest opening weekend of that year, behind Austin Powers in Goldmember, Star Wars: Episode II – Attack of the Clones, Harry Potter and the Chamber of Secrets and Spider-Man. This was also the third-highest opening weekend for a New Line Cinema film, trailing only behind Rush Hour 2 and Austin Powers in Goldmember. The film then made $101.5 million during its five-day Wednesday opening.

Outside the US and Canada, The Two Towers made $99.4 million from 25 territories during its opening weekend, which made it the highest international opening weekend. The combined total opening weekend gross increased to $189.9 million, making it the highest worldwide opening weekend of all time. The film would hold both records until 2003 when they were given to The Matrix Reloaded and its successor The Matrix Revolutions respectively. The Two Towers set opening day records in Germany, Austria, Finland, the Netherlands, Switzerland, Belgium, Sweden and Norway, as well as a single-day record in Denmark. It then made opening weekend records in the United Kingdom, Spain, France, Mexico, Norway, Switzerland, Denmark, Germany and South Korea.

The film went on to gross $339,789,881 in North America and $596,899,854 internationally for a worldwide total of $936,689,735 against a budget of $94 million. The Two Towers was the highest-grossing film of 2002 worldwide. Box Office Mojo estimates over 57 million sold tickets in the US in its initial theatrical run.

Through re-releases in 2003, 2011, 2017, 2019, 2020 and 2021, the film has grossed an additional $2,761,484 in the United States and Canada, and $8,043,876 overseas for a combined total of $10,805,360. This brings overall earnings to $342,952,511 domestic and $604,991,759 international for a worldwide total of $947,944,270.

Critical response

On review aggregator Rotten Tomatoes, The Two Towers holds an approval rating of 95% based on 256 reviews, with an average rating of 8.5/10. The website's critics consensus reads, "The Two Towers balances spectacular action with emotional storytelling, leaving audiences both wholly satisfied and eager for the final chapter." Metacritic, which uses a weighted average, has assigned the film a score of 87 out of 100 based on 39 reviews, indicating "universal acclaim". Audiences polled by CinemaScore gave the film an average grade of "A" on an A+ to F scale, a grade up from the "A−" earned by the previous film.

Like its predecessor, The Two Towers was released to universal critical acclaim. Roger Ebert of the Chicago Sun-Times gave the film three stars out of four, describing it as "one of the most spectacular swashbucklers ever made", and stating "It is not faithful to the spirit of Tolkien and misplaces much of the charm and whimsy of the books, but it stands on its own as a visionary thriller". Nev Pierce for the BBC gave the film four stars out of five, and wrote that while it lacked "the first film's wow-factor", it surpassed The Fellowship of the Ring "in terms of wit, action and narrative drive". Pierce described Gollum as "the first believable CG character" and the Battle of Helm's Deep as "one of the finest, most expansive combat sequences ever filmed". Writing for The Observer, Philip French described The Two Towers as a "stunning visual epic". French commended the battle scenes and the visual style of the film, relating it to the paintings of "Caspar David Friedrich, the Pre-Raphaelites, Art Nouveau illustrations for children's books, and the apocalyptic biblical landscapes ... of the Victorian visionary John Martin". He concluded the review looking forward to the release of the final chapter, writing "This is likely to be happier, more decisive and infinitely more satisfying than anything that will happen to our world in the next 12 months." Joe Morgenstern for The Wall Street Journal lauded the narrative construction of The Two Towers: "Elaborate preparations are required for the payoff in this installment -- the massing of troops plus much individual struggle as splintered groups of the Fellowship make their separate ways toward the defining battle of Helm's Deep ... Yet these preparations count as payoffs too ... Seldom has a popular entertainment set its stage so carefully or evocatively, with such lavish respect for its audience." Morgenstern also highlighted the digital effects and the battle scenes, and said of the series "The Lord of the Rings continues to stake its singular claim on movie history; it's a gift of epic proportions." In his review for the Evening Standard, Alexander Walker wrote that the Battle of Helm's Deep was "probably the greatest battlepiece composed for the screen since Eisenstein's Ivan the Terrible", and that with The Two Towers the trilogy had achieved "a majestic proportion, chivalric and quixotic, earthly and magical, an experience that reaches beyond the dimensions of the cinema screen and somehow reflects the global unease of the world in the first years of the 21st century".

In his review for Newsweek, David Ansen commended Jackson's direction of the battle scenes, writing "Few people can stage a battle -- and the eyepopping siege of Helms Deep is one of the most spectacular you'll ever see -- with such sweep and clarity that the carnage doesn't seem an oppressive end in itself". Ansen also praised the complexity of the character of Gollum, commenting "While everyone else in Tolkien's myth falls neatly into the camps of Good and Evil, the self-lacerating Gollum is at war with himself. In an epic drenched in medievalism, he's the dangerously ambiguous voice of the modern." Caroline Westbrook, for Empire, gave the film five stars out of five, and wrote "It may lack the first-view-thrill and natural dramatic shape of Fellowship, but this is both funnier and darker than the first film, and certainly more action-packed. An essential component of what is now destined to be among the best film franchises of all time." Westbrook lauded Jackson's ability to temper the spectacular scenes "with some heartstring-tugging moments - peasants despondent as they are forced to abandon their villages, Aragorn and Arwen's troubled relationship, and, of course, the return of Gandalf (Sir Ian McKellen, superb as ever), one of the film's most powerful, memorable images that may well leave Ring devotees a little misty-eyed." A less enthusiastic review was written in The Guardian by Peter Bradshaw, who had already written a mixed review of The Fellowship of the Ring. Bradshaw gave The Two Towers three stars out of five, appreciating it as "a very watchable, distinctive, if over-extended FX spectacle". However, he commented that the film could not be taken as "a serious evocation of good and evil", and dismissed the subject as "lots and lots of interminable nerdish nonsense".

The Battle of Helm's Deep has been named by CNN as one of the greatest screen battles of all time, while Gollum was named as the third favourite computer-generated film character by Entertainment Weekly in 2007.

Accolades

 Academy Awards
 Winner: Best Visual Effects (Jim Rygiel, Joe Letteri, Randall William Cook and Alex Funke) and Best Sound Editing (Ethan Van der Ryn and Michael Hopkins).
 Nominee: Best Picture (Fran Walsh, Philippa Boyens, Stephen Sinclair and Peter Jackson, producers), Best Art Direction (Art Direction: Grant Major; Set Decoration: Dan Hennah and Alan Lee), Best Film Editing (Michael J. Horton) and Best Sound (Christopher Boyes, Michael Semanick, Michael Hedges and Hammond Peek).
 British Academy Film Awards: Best Costume Design, Best Special Visual Effects, Orange Film of the Year (voted on by the public)
 Empire Awards: Best Picture
 Grammy Awards: Best Score (Howard Shore)
 Hugo Awards (World Science Fiction Society): Best Dramatic Presentation — Long Form
 2003 MTV Movie Awards: Best virtual performance (Gollum)
 Saturn Awards: Best Fantasy Film, Best Costume (Ngila Dickson), Best Supporting Actor (Andy Serkis)

American Film Institute Recognition
 AFI's 100 Years...100 Movie Quotes:
 "My precious." – #85

References

External links

 
 
 
 
 
 

2
2000s English-language films
2000s American films
2002 fantasy films
2002 films
American epic films
American fantasy adventure films
American sequel films
BAFTA winners (films)
Fantasy war films
Films about dwarfs
Films directed by Peter Jackson
Films produced by Barrie M. Osborne
Films produced by Fran Walsh
Films produced by Peter Jackson
Films scored by Howard Shore
Films shot in New Zealand
Films that won the Best Sound Editing Academy Award
Films that won the Best Visual Effects Academy Award
Films using motion capture
Films with screenplays by Fran Walsh
Films with screenplays by Peter Jackson
Films with screenplays by Philippa Boyens
Films with screenplays by Stephen Sinclair
High fantasy films
Hugo Award for Best Dramatic Presentation, Long Form winning works
Middle-earth (film franchise) films
Nebula Award for Best Script-winning works
New Line Cinema films
New Zealand epic films
New Zealand fantasy adventure films
New Zealand sequel films
Resurrection in film
Siege films
WingNut Films films
2000s British films